Gordon Schroeder (February 24, 1915- August 31, 1995) was an American racing car constructor.

History
Schroeder was born in Minneapolis, Minnesota.

In 1929, together with Riley Brett, Schroeder reconstructed an old V16 engine of a Frank Lockhart car for Myron Stevens.  Schroeder was enamoured by the engine and bought during the Second World War, with driver Sam Hanks qualifying it for front row in the 1946 Indy, only for the car not complete distance.  Schroeder also collaborated with Stevens and Clint Brawner to build cars in the 1950s.

Schroeder moved from racing to focus on a manufacturing business after the deaths of two of his friends, Rex Mays in 1949 and Bobby Ball in 1954.  He began work in steering hubs, starting with gears, in the mid 1940s; and went on to produce the first quick-release steering hub approved by NASCAR.

World Championship Indianapolis 500 results

References

 
 
 

Formula One constructors (Indianapolis only)
American racecar constructors
1915 births
1995 deaths